Jusu Q. B. Sawi is a Sierra Leonean politician from the opposition Sierra Leone People's Party (SLPP) who is currently a member of Parliament of Sierra Leone representing Kailahun District. Sawi first ran for a seat in parliament in the 2002 general election, in which he won by a large margin. He won re-election in the 2007 general election, although the SLPP lost the majority of seats in parliament to the then opposition All People's Congress (APC). Jusu Sawi is a member of the Mende ethnic group from Kailahun District.[ deceased]

External links 
Parliament Members

Year of birth missing (living people)
Living people
Members of the Parliament of Sierra Leone
Sierra Leone People's Party politicians
People from Kailahun District